The Massif des Maures ("plateau of the Moors") is a small mountain range in southeastern France. It is located in the department of Var, near Fraxinet and between Hyères and Fréjus.

Geography
It lies between the River Argens and the River Réal Martin to the north and the Mediterranean coast to the south, the River Durance to the west and the foothills of the Alps to the east, between Hyères and Fréjus. The winters are mild and the amounts of precipitation are low, especially in the summer when many of the streams run dry. The sides of the hills are steep, the soil is thin and there are few settlements; cultivated crops include grapes, citrus, olives, figs, mulberries and almonds.

The detailed geography of the massif is complex; it is arranged along three main ridge lines, oriented west/southwest to east/northeast, the maximum altitudes of which decrease from north to south. The most northerly ridge carries at its western end the highest points of the massif: the Signal de la Sauvette  and Notre-Dame-des-Anges  peaks. Further south, an intermediate ridge culminates at  not far from the Chartreuse de la Verne.

Flora and fauna

The massif is densely vegetated with an evergreen forest dominated by cork oak, holm oak, holly sweet chestnut and strawberry trees. On the highest ridges Aleppo pine and stone pine flourish.

Since the early 21st century, there have been more frequent destructive wildfires, but the cork oak is particularly resistant to these; the thick bark protects the trunk and new shoots grow from the blackened branches. Shrubs present on the forest floor include myrtle, juniper, boxwood, broom, heather, rosemary and Spanish lavender.

This is one of the last places in Europe where Hermann's tortoise can be found. Other reptiles include the European green lizard, the ocellated lizard, the grass snake, the European adder, and the Aesculapian snake. In thick parts of the forest, wild boars are attracted by the acorns and chestnuts, and deer, badgers, foxes, squirrels and the occasional hare roam among the trees. Birds of prey include the short-toed snake eagle, the horned owl, the tawny owl, and the little owl.

See also
 Massif de l'Esterel
 Umayyad invasion of Gaul

References

Landforms of Var (department)
Mountain ranges of Provence-Alpes-Côte d'Azur